2 and 3 Part Inventions is a ballet made by New York City Ballet ballet master Jerome Robbins on students at its affiliated school, the School of American Ballet, to Bach's Inventions and Sinfonias, BWV 772–801, (1720–23). The premiere took place on Saturday, 4 June 1994 at the Juilliard Theater, Lincoln Center. The City Ballet premiere was Thursday, 19 January 1995, and it was revived for City Ballet's 90th anniversary celebration of the choreographer, performed again by students from S.A.B.

Casts

Original SAB 

   
Kristina Fernandez
Eliane Munier
Riolama Lorenzo
Jennifer Chipman
 
Benjamin Millepied
Amaury Lebrun
Alex Ketley
Seth Belliston

NYCB premiere 

   
Wendy Whelan
Jenifer Ringer
Samantha Allen
Miranda Weese
 
Ethan Stiefel
Alexander Ritter
Christopher Wheeldon
 James Fayette

Articles 

  
NY Times, Anna Kisselgoff, April 5, 2005 

NY Times, Anna Kisselgoff, May 11, 1998

Reviews 

  
NY Times, Anna Kisselgoff, June 6, 1994 
NY Times, Anna Kisselgoff, January 21, 1995 

NY Times, Jack Anderson, January 18, 2001 
NY Times, Gia Kourlas, June 16, 2008 

Ballets by Jerome Robbins
Ballets to the music of Johann Sebastian Bach
New York City Ballet repertory
1994 ballet premieres